The 2022 FC Kairat season was the 12th successive season that the club played in the Kazakhstan Premier League, the highest tier of association football in Kazakhstan, since their promotion back to the top flight in 2009. Kairat finished the Premier League season in 4th position, missing out on European competition for the first time since 2013. In the domestic cups, Kairat reached the Quarterfinals of the Kazakhstan Cup, and where runners-up to Tobol in the season opening Super Cup. In Europe, Kairat entered and were knocked out of the Europa Conference League in the Second qualifying round by Kisvárda.

Season events
On 6 June, Kurban Berdyev left his role as Head Coach by mutual agreement. Two days later, 8 June, Kirill Keker was appointed as his replacement.

Squad

Transfers

In

Loans in

Out

Loans out

Released

Friendlies

Competitions

Overview

Super Cup

Premier League

Results summary

Results by round

League table

Results

Kazakhstan Cup

Group stage

Knockout stages

UEFA Europa Conference League

Qualifying rounds

Squad statistics

Appearances and goals

|-
|colspan="14"|Players away from Kairat on loan:
|-
|colspan="14"|Players who left Kairat during the season:

|}

Goal scorers

Clean sheets

Disciplinary record

References

External links
Official Website

FC Kairat seasons
Kairat
2022–23 UEFA Europa Conference League participants seasons